Lyndeborough  is a town in Hillsborough County, New Hampshire, United States. The population was 1,702 at the 2020 census.

History 

Originally granted by the Massachusetts General Court to veterans from Salem, Massachusetts, of New England's first war with Canada, the area was known as "Salem-Canada". John Cram and his family were the first settlers and established a sawmill in the community in 1736. The name "Lyndeborough" resulted from a re-grant to a group of people that included Benjamin Lynde, who later became Chief Justice of Massachusetts. This group of proprietors never lived in Lyndeborough and may never have visited the community. For instance, while serving as a proprietor of Lyndeborough, Judge Lynde lived in Massachusetts, where he presided in Suffolk County over the trial stemming from the Boston Massacre.

The town has been home to the Lafayette Artillery Company (founded 1804) since 1833. The town office building, Citizens' Hall (opened 1889), is listed on the National Register of Historic Places, as is the Lyndeborough Center Historic District, which consists of the Congregational church, town hall (1846), and remnants of the town pound (1774).

Geography 
The central and southern portions of town are drained by Stony Brook and Curtis Brook, southeast-flowing tributaries of the Souhegan River, while the northern part is drained by Cold Brook, an east-flowing tributary of the South Branch Piscataquog River. The entire town is part of the Merrimack River watershed.

Notable summits in town include Winn Mountain, Rose Mountain, and The Pinnacle. The town is crossed by New Hampshire Route 31, which leads northwest into Greenfield and southeast into Wilton.

Adjacent municipalities 
 Francestown, New Hampshire (north)
 New Boston, New Hampshire (northeast)
 Mont Vernon, New Hampshire (east)
 Milford, New Hampshire (southeast)
 Wilton, New Hampshire (south)
 Temple, New Hampshire (southwest)
 Greenfield, New Hampshire (west)

Demographics 

As of the census of 2000, there were 1,585 people, 560 households, and 420 families residing in the town.  The population density was 51.0 people per square mile (19.7/km2).  There were 587 housing units at an average density of 18.9 per square mile (7.3/km2).  The racial makeup of the town was 98.17% White, 0.19% African American, 0.13% Native American, 0.32% Asian, 0.38% from other races, and 0.82% from two or more races. Hispanic or Latino of any race were 1.64% of the population.

There were 560 households, out of which 37.1% had children under the age of 18 living with them, 67.7% were married couples living together, 4.8% had a female householder with no husband present, and 25.0% were non-families. 16.4% of all households were made up of individuals, and 5.7% had someone living alone who was 65 years of age or older.  The average household size was 2.83 and the average family size was 3.20.

In the town, the population was spread out, with 26.9% under the age of 18, 6.3% from 18 to 24, 32.6% from 25 to 44, 27.3% from 45 to 64, and 6.9% who were 65 years of age or older.  The median age was 38 years. For every 100 females, there were 102.9 males.  For every 100 females age 18 and over, there were 99.8 males.

The median income for a household in the town was $59,688, and the median income for a family was $70,223. Males had a median income of $37,941 versus $29,327 for females. The per capita income for the town was $27,169.  About 1.2% of families and 3.3% of the population were below the poverty line, including 3.0% of those under age 18 and 8.4% of those age 65 or over.

Notable people 
 William Barron (1787–1872), United States Marshal for the District of Vermont
 Eddie Mottau, guitarist
 Willard Parker (1800–1884), pioneering surgeon

Sites of interest 
 Citizens' Hall
 Hartshorn Memorial Cannon
 Lafayette Artillery Company
 Lyndeborough Center Historic District

References

External links 
 
 J. A. Tarbell Library
 New Hampshire Economic and Labor Market Information Bureau Profile

 
Towns in Hillsborough County, New Hampshire
Populated places established in 1764
Towns in New Hampshire
1764 establishments in New Hampshire